THK may refer to:

THK Co., Ltd., a Japanese machinery components manufacturing and engineering company
Tōkai Television Broadcasting, a TV station in Nagoya, Japan
Türk Hava Kurumu, the Turkish Aeronautical Association, builder of a number of glider and aircraft types
Türk Hava Kuvvetleri, the Turkish Air Force